Magoua, which may derive from a word in Atikamekw: Makwa ) which means loon (gavia immer), is a particular dialect of basilectal Quebec French spoken in the Trois-Rivières area, between Trois-Rivières and Maskinongé.  Long before a military fort was constructed there, Trois-Rivières became in 1615 the first stronghold of the coureurs des bois outside the city of Québec.  Magoua is the ethnonym applied to their descendants in the area. Magoua is the most conservative of all Quebec French varieties, including Joual. It preserves the sontaient ("étaient") characteristic of Métis French and Cajun French, has a creole-like past tense particle tà and has old present-tense contraction of a former verb "to be" that behave in the same manner as subject clitics.

Morphology and vocabulary

Bibliography
Demharter, Cheryl A. 1980. «Les diphtongues du français canadien de la Mauricie.» The French Review 53.848-864.
Demharter, Cheryl A. 1981. Une Étude phonologique du français parlé à Sainte-Flore, Province de Québec. Tulane University, New Orleans: Ph.D. dissertation.
Deshaies, Denise. 1974.  A socio-phonetic study of a Quebec French community: Trois-Rivières. University College of London: Doctoral thesis, 390 p.
Deshaies, Denise. 1982. "Le français parlé à Trois-Rivières et le français parlé dans la ville de Québec". Langue et Société au Québec, Québec, 11-13 novembre 1982 (Atelier 215).
Deshaies, Denise. 1984. "Deux analyses sociolinguistiques: Trois-Rivières et Québec". In Michel Amyot & Gilles Bibeau (ed.), Le statut culturel du français au Québec. Québec: Éditeur officiel du Québec, vol. 2, .
Hardy, René. 2015. «Magouas et fiers de l’être.» La Gazette de la Mauricie, 9 janvier.
Michaud, Émmanuel. 2014. Ni Amérindiens ni Eurocanadiens: une approche néomoderne du culturalisme métis au Canada. Thèse Ph.D., Université Laval, Québec.
Wittmann, Henri, 1976. «Contraintes linguistiques et sociales dans la troncation du /l/ à Trois-Rivières.» Cahiers de linguistique de l'Université du Québec 6.13-22.

Wittmann, Henri, 1998. Les créolismes syntaxiques du français magoua parlé aux Trois-Rivières." Français d'Amérique: variation, créolisation, normalisation ('Actes du colloque, Université d'Avignon, 8-11 oct. 1996'), dir. Patrice Brasseur, 229-48. Avignon: Université d'Avignon, Centre d'études canadiennes.
Wittmann, Henri, 1999. "Les équivalents non existentiels du verbe être dans les langues de l'Afrique de l'Ouest, en créole haïtien et en français magoua." Communication, 9e Congrès international des études créoles, Aix-en-Provence, 24-29 juin 1999. English abstract: "Non-existential analogues of the verb to be in West African Languages, in Haitian Creole and in Magoua French."
Wittmann, Henri, 2001. "Les Magouas aux Trois-Rivières." Conférence, Premier Séminaire annuel du Centre d'analyse des langues et littératures francophones d'Amérique, Carleton University, Ottawa, mars 2001.

See also
 Joual
 Chaouin
 Quebec French
 Trois-Rivières
 Henri Wittmann

Quebec French
Culture of Quebec